Ferbane/Belmont GAA is a football club in the Gaelic Athletic Association located in Ferbane in County Offaly, Ireland, 13 miles from Birr. The Ferbane GAA field is located in the town of Ferbane on the Ballycumber Road. Ferbane play in the Offaly championship.

Ferbane holds the record for the club with the longest continuous sponsorship deal in Gaelic football.

Honours

Football
Ferbane enjoyed most of their success in the '80s and start of '90s where they won a 5 in a row of Offaly Senior Football Championship titles  from 1986–90 and also a Leinster Senior Club Football Championship title in 1986 beating Portlaoise. Gallen community school also brought the senior all-Ireland vocational schools title to Ferbane where they beat Clonakilty cc in Croke Park.
all Ireland runners up 2012. More recently Gallen community school have won the 2016 post primary schools B football title beating Mountbellew in the final. In 2019 the club bridged a 25-year gap by defeating Rhode in the County Senior Football Final by 2-13 to 0-14. Seán Dempsey was manager.

 Leinster Senior Club Football Championships: (1) 
 1986
 Offaly Senior Football Championships: (12)
 1914, 1971, 1974, 1976, 1986, 1987, 1988, 1989, 1990, 1992, 1994, 2019
 Offaly Intermediate Football Championships: (3)
 1957, 1959, 1996,2018
 Offaly Junior Football Championships: (5)
 1924, 1952, 1964, 1995, 2016

Belmont Football Titles
 Offaly Intermediate Football Championships: (2)
 1951, 1993
 Offaly Junior Football Championships: (3)
 1923, 1950, 1985

Hurling
U21 County title in 2003 (vs Drumcullen in Páirc Naomh Raonagh in Banagher)

Intermediate County Title in 2004 (vs Kilcormac/Kiloughey in Páirc Naomh Raonagh in Banagher)

Minor A runners up in 2015 vs Na Fianna

 Offaly Intermediate Hurling Championships: (1)
 2004
 Offaly Junior A Hurling Championships: (4)
 1952, 1957, 1997, 2017

Ferbane hurling titles
 Offaly Junior A Hurling Championships: (1)
 1989

Hurling
The Hurling club in the Ferbane Parish is known as Belmont. Named after the village of Belmont which is the Hurling stronghold of the Ferbane Parish

References

External links
Offaly GAA site
Official Ferbane GAA Club website
Ferbane GAA web page on the Ferbane Town website

Gaelic games clubs in County Offaly
Gaelic football clubs in County Offaly
Hurling clubs in County Offaly